Oakton High School is a public high school in unincorporated Fairfax County, Virginia, in proximity to the town of Vienna, in the United States. It is part of Fairfax County Public Schools in Northern Virginia.

History 
Oakton High School was founded in 1967 in Vienna, Virginia. The original Oakton High School was located in the facility which Oakton Elementary School now uses. When it opened, Oakton was the host facility for an IBM 1401, which was Fairfax County's first computer. A computer curriculum, one of the first offered at the high school level, was available to full-time Oakton students and students from several other county high schools on a part-time basis. This system was retired in the early seventies when Fairfax County installed an IBM 360 mainframe at the Annandale campus of Northern Virginia Community College.

In 1973, while W. T. Woodson High School in nearby Fairfax City was being repaired after an April 1 tornado struck and damaged it, Woodson students attended the remainder of the school year in a split shift at Oakton High School (Oakton students in the morning; Woodson students in the afternoon).

The school achieved international notoriety in 2009 when it suspended, and threatened to expel, a student for taking a birth control pill while on school premises. The incident was referenced during the August 3, 2009 episode of The Colbert Report, with the show satirically portraying the student as a "druggie".

School structure 
Oakton High School is led by Principal Jamie Lane and Assistant Principals Mary Landis, James Oberndorf, Salvatore Olivo, and Lawrence Stroud. 

Oakton operates on a block schedule five days a week, alternating between "Burgundy" and "Gold" days.

Feeder schools 
Crossfield Elementary School, Mosaic Elementary School, Navy Elementary School, Marshall Road Elementary School, Oakton Elementary School, Waples Mill Elementary School, Franklin Middle School, Thoreau Middle School, Luther Jackson Middle School, and Rachel Carson Middle School are all in the Oakton School Pyramid.

Admissions 

{| class="wikitable mw-collapsible mw-collapsed" style="text-align:right;"
!colspan="7|Demographics
|-
!
!colspan="2" style="text-align:center;" |2017–18
!colspan="2" style="text-align:center;" |2018–19
!colspan="2" style="text-align:center;" |2019–20
|-
! scope="col" style="text-align:center;" | Subgroup
! scope="col" style="text-align:center;" | Count
! scope="col" style="text-align:center;" | %
! scope="col" style="text-align:center;" | Count
! scope="col" style="text-align:center;" | %
! scope="col" style="text-align:center;" | Count
! scope="col" style="text-align:center;" | %
|-
| style="text-align:left;" | All Students || 2652 || 100.0% || 2750 || 100.0% || 2744 || 100.0%
|-
| style="text-align:left;" | Female || 1294 || 48.8% || 1322 || 48.1% || 1312 || 47.8%
|-
| style="text-align:left;" | Male || 1358 || 51.2% || 1428 || 51.9% || 1432 || 52.2%
|-
| style="text-align:left;" | American Indian || 10 || 0.4% || 5 || 0.2% || 5 || 0.2%
|-
| style="text-align:left;" | Asian || 779 || 29.4% || 858 || 31.2% || 887 || 32.3%
|-
| style="text-align:left;" | Black || 129 || 4.9% || 127 || 4.6% || 138 || 5.0%
|-
| style="text-align:left;" | Hispanic || 294 || 11.1% || 302 || 11.0% || 306 || 11.2%
|-
| style="text-align:left;" | Native Hawaiian || 6 || 0.2% || 7 || 0.3% || 6 || 0.2%
|-
| style="text-align:left;" | White || 1299 || 49.0% || 1300 || 47.3% || 1235 || 45.0%
|-
| style="text-align:left;" | Multiple Races || 135 || 5.1% || 151 || 5.5% || 167 || 6.1%
|-
| style="text-align:left;" | Students with Disabilities || 277 || 10.4% || 294 || 10.7% || 269 || 9.8%
|-
| style="text-align:left;" | Students without Disabilities || 2375 || 89.6% || 2456 || 89.3% || 2475 || 90.2%
|-
| style="text-align:left;" | Economically Disadvantaged || 340 || 12.8% || 405 || 14.7% || 301 || 11.0%
|-
| style="text-align:left;" | Not Economically Disadvantaged || 2312 || 87.2% || 2345 || 85.3% || 2443 || 89.0%
|-
| style="text-align:left;" | English Learners || 308 || 11.6% || 352 || 12.8% || 290 || 10.6%
|-
| style="text-align:left;" | Not English Learners || 2344 || 88.4% || 2398 || 87.2% || 2454 || 89.4%
|-
| style="text-align:left;" | Homeless || 7 || 0.3% || 3 || 0.1% || 5 || 0.2%
|-
| style="text-align:left;" | Military Connected || 15 || 0.6% || 39 || 1.4% || 46 || 1.7%
|-
| style="text-align:left;" | Foster Care || 2 || 0.1% || 2 || 0.1% || 1 || 0.0%
|}

Curriculum 
The school offers various elective courses and allows students to participate in academy courses (courses hosted by other schools at other school sites). Elective courses include psychology, various engineering courses, journalism, video production, accounting, multivariable calculus with linear algebra, astronomy and six foreign languages.

Oakton offers an Advanced Placement (AP) program and a large variety of AP classes in major subject areas, including English, Social Studies, Science, Foreign Languages, Math, Performing Arts, and Fine Arts. Post-AP courses, such as multivariable calculus and linear algebra are available to sufficiently advanced students.

Virginia Index of Performance (VIP) awards

Oakton is a frequent recipient of the annual Virginia Index of Performance (VIP) awards, which, since 2007, recognize advanced learning and achievement and are awarded by the Governor of Virginia and the Virginia Department of Education.

{| class="wikitable"
!colspan="2"|Virginia Index of Performance Awards
|-
! scope="col"| Award
! scope="col"| Year(s) Earned
|-
| Governor's Excellence Award || 2008, 2010, 2011
|-
| Board of Education Excellence Award || 2009, 2012, 2015–2019
|-
| Board of Education Distinguished Achievement Award || 2014
|}

US News & World Report Best High Schools rankings

In 2022, U.S. News & World Report ranked Oakton #282 nationally among U.S. public high schools. In the same report, Oakton was ranked as the #6 high school in Virginia.

{| class="wikitable" style="text-align: center;"
!colspan="4"|US News & World Report Best High Schools
|-
! scope="col" style="text-align: center;" | Year
! scope="col" style="text-align: center;" | National
! scope="col" style="text-align: center;" | Virginia
! scope="col" style="text-align: center;" | Reference
|-
| 2012 || 165 || 9 || 
|-
| 2013 || 118 || 6 ||
|-
| 2014 || 111 || 5 ||
|-
| 2015 || 158 || 6 ||
|-
| 2016 || 162 || 5 ||
|-
| 2017 || 198 || 4 ||
|-
| 2018 || 247 || 6 ||
|-
| 2019 || 173 || 4 ||
|-
| 2020 || 503 || 11 ||
|-
| 2022 || 282 || 6 ||
|}

Standardized testing 
Oakton High School is a fully accredited high school based on Virginia's Standards of Learning tests. The average SAT score in 2006 for Oakton High School was 1,703 (568 in Critical Reading, 578 in Math, and 557 in Writing).

In 2022, SAT Scores at Oakton High School were the fourth highest out of all Fairfax County High Schools. SAT Scores at Oakton High School were higher than both national and state averages.

Extracurricular activities

Performing arts 
Oakton's Performing Arts Department, which includes band, choral, orchestral, and theatre arts departments, regularly earns distinction as one of the premier performing arts programs in the area.

In 2008, the performing arts department won the Blue Ribbon Award, a result of Superior ratings for all Band, Choral, and Orchestra groups in state festivals.

Bands 

The Oakton Band program consists of a marching band, three concert bands, two jazz bands, a winter color guard, a drumline program, and several guitar classes and ensembles.

Oakton has been recognized as a Virginia Honor Band (the highest award for high school band programs) twenty-three times, including eleven consecutive years from 1995 to 2005. This award is given to bands that receive superior marks for marching and concert performances of the top band. The marching band has won other awards at competitions throughout the country and has been featured in parades and professional football games. The concert bands have made many appearances at Fiesta-val competitions, including locales such as Orlando, Toronto, Myrtle Beach, and Chicago.

Oakton hosts the Oakton Classic marching band competition, a fundraiser. The Classic has been held annually (usually in October) every year since 1986, with a gap year in 2012.

Chorus 
Oakton High School has four regular in-school choruses; Oakton Singers, Chamber Choir, Women's Treble Choir, and Men's Choir. The department also has three after-school specialty groups: Jazz choir, men's a cappella (the Accents), and women's a cappella (The Actaves). Both a cappella groups are student-run.

Theatre 

In recent years, the drama program has put on Arsenic and Old Lace, The Wizard of Oz, and other plays and musicals. The 2007–08 season included The Importance of Being Earnest, You're a Good Man, Charlie Brown and Into the Woods. The 2008–09 season included The Foreigner, and The Odd Couple (female version). The spring 2009 musical was Little Women.

Performances usually occur in the Robert "Skip" Bromley Auditorium, dedicated in 2008. Oakton Drama is to, for the 2009–10 season, produce A Tisket, A Tasket, Four Dames and a Casket (a play written by a student attending Oakton) and Rehearsal for Murder. Most recently, former student Henry Ragan starred in Oklahoma! by Rodgers and Hammerstein, for which he was nominated a Cappies award. Following spring musicals included Anything Goes (2011), Footloose (2012), Grease (2013), The Pirates of Penzance (2014), and Mary Poppins (2015). In the 2015–2016 season, Oakton Drama put on The Phantom of the Opera. In the 2016–17 season, the department put on Once In A Lifetime (a play by Moss Hart and George S. Kaufman), Cyrano (an 1897 play written by Edmond Rostand), a One Act Night, and Les Misérables: School Edition.

The 2017–18 Performance Season comprised Much Ado About Nothing by William Shakespeare. Next Almost, Maine by John Cariani, then Orphie and the Book of Heroes by Kooman and Dimond, followed by their annual Cougar Dinner Theatre and VHSL One Act Night, which featured the first high school production of Lin-Manuel Miranda's 21 Chump Street. The season ended with their annual spring musical, Titanic. It was nominated for 16 total National Capital Area Cappie awards, the highest to date for an Oakton Production. Oakton Drama won awards for Best Orchestra and Best Special Effects.

The Oakton High School strings program consists of four orchestras, ordered in decreasing difficulty level: the Chamber Orchestra, the Philharmonic Orchestra, the Symphonic Orchestra, and the Concert Orchestra. The orchestras typically give four concerts a year, consisting of performances by the Chamber Orchestra, the Philharmonic Orchestra, the Symphonic Orchestra, and the Concert Orchestra. The program has participated in many festivals worldwide, in locations such as Hawaii, Italy, Orlando, and Chicago. In 2007, Concert Orchestra was introduced. This class meets every day during 4th period, allowing students to learn how to play a stringed instrument in a learner-friendly environment. The other two orchestras meet on alternating days due to Oakton's block scheduling. In 2018, the newest orchestra, Philharmonic, was created. This class meets on Gold Days during the 8th period, where students continue developing their skills—focusing on advanced technical and ensemble skills.

The Chamber Orchestra participated in the Orchestra America National Festival in Indianapolis, part of the Music for All National Festival, in 2008. The orchestra applied and was accepted in 2007 and prepared an approximately 45-minute concert consisting of three pieces. On March 1, 2008, the Chamber Orchestra performed its selections at the Hilbert Circle Theatre, home of the Indianapolis Symphony Orchestra. Later that year, the Chamber Orchestra was accepted to perform at the American String Teachers Association National Conference, which took place in March 2009 in Atlanta. The group placed 4th, the highest ranking of a non-magnet, non-music school.

In 2022, the Oakton Theatre Department performed Peter Pan.

Honor Council 
Oakton High School has a student-led Honor Council. The role of the Honor Council is to promote honesty and integrity throughout Oakton High School while enforcing the Oakton academic honor code. The Oakton HS Honor Council has two processes for students suspected of breaking the honor code: the Punitive Council or Restorative Justice.

Punitive Council
The Punitive Council is the more traditional way the Honor Code has applied to students. If a teacher suspects a student of violating the Honor Code, the teacher fills out a form and turns it in to the Honor Council. The teacher also gives the suspect a form to fill out and for the suspect's parent or legal guardian to sign. The teacher and the student are allowed to prepare written testimonies about the possible Honor Code infraction. Usually, within a month, student representatives from the Honor Council and randomly selected staff members will be chosen to serve on a punitive council to determine whether or not a possible infraction occurred. The Punitive Council will read through both testimonies and evidence, if there is any, to decide on the possible infraction. The decision of the punitive council is final.

Restorative Justice
The Restorative Justice Program is a new development at Oakton HS. Restorative Justice is meant to help repair the relationships between the victim and the offender involved in an incident. The only way for a student to be able to participate in the Oakton Honor Council Restorative Justice is to admit to the Honor Code infraction. Once both the student and teacher agree, separate initial interviews will occur. Then, a circle with a Restorative Justice trained Honor Council member, and the offender and the victim discuss their actions and feelings and work towards an amicable solution to the Honor Code infraction.

Publications 

Oakton's award-winning publications provide many opportunities for students to express themselves. Its Publications Department produces a newspaper, The Outlook, a yearbook called Paragon, and a literary magazine, Opus. In October 2006, both The Outlook and Paragon received Trophy-Class honors at the Virginia High School League, with a rating of Superior. In April 2008, Paragon received a Pacemaker award, one of the highest honors in high school journalism, as well as 8th in best of show. The Outlook placed 6th in best of show. The school used to have a radio club, Fat Cat Radio, and a daily television show, Cougar News.

Every Friday, 'Oakton on Air', Oakton's student-led news show, is broadcast by teachers during the day's first period.

Athletics 

Oakton is a member of the AAA Concorde District and the Northern Region of the Virginia High School League. Its cross country, football, baseball, lacrosse, and men's swimming teams have all claimed recent Virginia state titles. In addition, Oakton fields several highly-competitive teams for club sports, such as crew and ice hockey. The Oakton Ice Hockey Club plays in the Northern Virginia Scholastic Hockey League (NVSHL).

2005–06
During the 2005–06 school year, Oakton Baseball was runner-up. Oakton claimed three state titles: boys' cross country, football, and girls' lacrosse. The boys' lacrosse team, with its loss to Robinson Secondary School, ended its three-year streak as state champions.

2006–07
The baseball team won regionals. Oakton's golf team placed 3rd in the district and 1st in the region. The boys' cross country team placed 1st in the district and region and 2nd in the state. The field hockey team placed 1st in the district. The men's swim and dive team finished second at each district, regional, and state. The girls' basketball team was the district champion and region runner-up, with identical results to last year. The boys' track and field team won districts, and the girls' lacrosse team, went on to win regionals and states.

2007–08
Danny Kim won the boys' state golf tournament as an individual, and Amanda Steinhagen won the girl's state championship, with Lauren Greenlief coming in second. The boys' cross-country team won the district title and was second in the region. The girls' cross country team also won the district title, was 4th in the region and returned to take 2nd in the state meet. The men's swim team placed 2nd in districts, regionals, and finals to Robinson Secondary School. The girls' lacrosse team won the regional and state championships.

2008–09
The boys' cross-country team won district, region, and state titles. The girls' cross country team finished third in the district and were runners-up in the region. With a perfect 10–0 season, the football team won the district and regional titles, finishing with a 13–1 record and losing 10–7 to Oscar Smith High School in the state semi-finals. The boys' swim and dive team placed third in the district and won the regional title, and the girls' swim and dive team placed second in the district. The girls' basketball team finished with a perfect season, won the district and regional titles, and was runner-up in the state. The girls' indoor track and field team won the district title. The boys' outdoor track and field team won the district title.

2009–10
The boys' cross country team won the district title for the fifth straight year; they also won the region title for the fourth time in five years and were runners-up in the state. The girls' cross-country team finished second in the district and sixth in the region. The girls' indoor track and field team won the district title for the second straight year.

The boys' basketball team won its first District title since 1972.

The boys' swim and dive team won the state, regional, and district championship titles. Senior Bradley Phillips won the 400-meter freestyle, setting a national record, and the 200-meter freestyle. Senior KJ Park won the 200-meter IM and the 100-meter breaststroke. The men's 400 freestyle relay also won and set a national record. The girls' swim and dive team placed fourth at state. Junior Kaitlin Pawlowicz won the 100-meter butterfly and the 200-meter IM and set a national record in the 200-meter IM.

Amanda Steinhagen became the first girl to win the Virginia High School League (VHSL) girls' high school golf championship twice.

State champions and recognitions